John Wilson (born 1 September 1947) is an Australian cricketer. He played twelve first-class and three List A matches for New South Wales between 1968/69 and 1971/72.

See also
 List of New South Wales representative cricketers

References

External links
 

1947 births
Living people
Australian cricketers
New South Wales cricketers
Cricketers from Sydney